Dnevnik means "The Daily" or "Daily News" in South Slavic languages. It can also be translated as "Diary". 

Closely related Slavic variants of the word are Deník (Czech) Dziennik (Polish) and Дневник (Russian).

It may refer to:

In broadcasting
 Dnevnik HRT, a Croatian TV news program broadcast daily on the Croatian Radiotelevision (HRT) at 19:30
 Dnevnik Nove TV, a Croatian TV news program broadcast daily on Nova TV at 19:15

In print media
 Dnevnik (Bulgaria), a Bulgarian business-oriented daily published in Sofia
 Dnevnik (Macedonia), a Macedonian daily published in Skopje
 Dnevnik (Serbia), a Serbian daily published in Novi Sad
 Dnevnik (Slovenia), a Slovenian daily published in Ljubljana

ru:Дневник (значения)